Tipula unca is a species of cranefly.

Distribution
Palaearctic.

Description
See

References

 

Tipulidae
Diptera of Europe
Diptera of Asia
Insects described in 1833